Alexander Taylor Goodwin (August 9, 1837 – July 3, 1899) was an American lawyer and politician from New York.

Biography
He was the son of Robert Morris Goodwin (1796–1861) and Elizabeth Ann (Taylor) Goodwin (1802–1882). He was born and attended private schools in Savannah. In 1852, the family removed to New Brunswick, New Jersey, and Alexander graduated from Rutgers College. In 1858, he began to study law in the office of Conkling & Throop in Utica, New York, was admitted to the bar in 1859, and practiced in Utica. On November 11, 1863, he married Mary Wager, daughter of State Senator David Wager (c.1804–1870), and they had three daughters two of whom died in infancy.

In 1863, he was appointed as a clerk in the New York Adjutant General's office; and soon after commissioned as adjutant of the 45th Regiment of the National Guard. He was Recorder of the City of Utica from 1864 to 1868.

He was a member of the New York State Senate (19th D.) in 1878 and 1879.

He was Mayor of Utica from 1890 to 1892; and a presidential elector in 1892, voting for Grover Cleveland and Adlai E. Stevenson.

Personal life 
Goodwin was an Episcopalian.

References

Sources
 Civil List and Constitutional History of the Colony and State of New York compiled by Edgar Albert Werner (1884; pg. 291)
 The State Government for 1879 by Charles G. Shanks (Weed, Parsons & Co, Albany NY, 1879; pg. 61)
 SWITCHED OFF FOR MURPHY in NYT on January 10, 1893
 The Goodwin Families in America (1899; pg. 113)

1837 births
1899 deaths
Democratic Party New York (state) state senators
Mayors of Utica, New York
New York (state) state court judges
Politicians from Savannah, Georgia
1892 United States presidential electors
Rutgers University alumni
19th-century American Episcopalians
19th-century American judges